Stockholmspartiet is a Political Party in Sweden, registered for the Municipal and County Council elections. It was founded in 1979 and was represented in the Stockholm city council from 1979-2002. It failed to reach enough votes to return in the elections of 2006.

The Party has a political base of issues concerning the capital Stockholm, such as traffic. It has traditionally often had a role of balancing the power between the two major political blocs in Sweden, but it currently follows a centre-right political agenda. 

Swedish local political parties